Neil Antony Back MBE (born 16 January 1969) is a former international rugby union footballer for England and the British & Irish Lions who also played for Nottingham RFC, Leicester Tigers, and captained both England and Leicester during his career.

Following World Cup victory with England in 2003, he took on the role of Player/Defensive Coach for Leicester Tigers until he retired, following an illustrious 17-year first class playing career.  One of his final games saw him become the oldest test British Lion in the history of the game, in the first test match verses New Zealand, on the 2005 tour.

During his international career he played in three World Cups, 1995, 1999, and 2003, where he was an integral part of the 2003 World Cup winning side. He also went on three Lions tours: the victorious tour to South Africa in 1997, and to Australia in 2001 and New Zealand in 2005. He earned 66 caps for England, captaining them to victory four times, and scored 16 tries and 1 drop goal (the only England forward to do so in a test match in the history of the game). He played as an open-side flanker. He is married to Alison, with whom he has a daughter, Olivia, who joined him on the winning podium in 2003, and a son, Finley.

Retirement from playing allowed him to concentrate on his future, seeing him continue his role as Assistant Coach at Leicester Tigers whilst gaining all of the RFU Coaching Awards; he now has over a decade of coaching experience.

Youth 
Back was born in Coventry, where he attended The Woodlands School between September 1980 and July 1987. During his time at the school, he also played football, cricket, basketball, athletics and cross country before opting to strive to gain international status in rugby union. Back learnt his trade at junior clubs in Coventry, Earlsdon RFC and Barker's Butts RFC, and went on to represent England at Schools, Colts, U21 and Saxons levels.

Playing career
He made his full England debut against Scotland in 1994. He began his senior playing career in 1988 for Nottingham.

In 1990 he joined Leicester Tigers and remained there for the next 18 years as a player and coach, gaining 339 caps and scoring a club record (for a forward) 125 tries.

His most controversial moment came in Leicester's 1996 Pilkington Cup final defeat against Bath. As the final whistle was blown, Back pushed referee Steve Lander to the ground. Back maintained that he had mistaken Lander for Bath back-row (and future England head coach) Andy Robinson. Back was given a six-month ban from the game, but from a dark moment blazed back even fitter, fresher and more focused than he had ever been following a 20-week, 6 days a week, twice a day torturous training schedule.

This led to a call-up to the 1997 British Lions tour to South Africa, where he played in the final two Test Matches, the second where the Series was won. He subsequently became an important part of Clive Woodward's England team, forming the famous back-row unit with Richard Hill and Lawrence Dallaglio. He was also one of five Tigers players selected for his 2nd Lions Tour 2001 British & Irish Lions tour to Australia picking up another two Test caps and then went on to become the oldest Test Lion in history on his 3rd and final Tour to NZ in 2005 picking up his 5th Test cap in the 1st Test.

Back was a master of controlling the ball at the back of a rolling maul and in 1999 he was Leicester's top try scorer with 16 tries as Tigers often kicked penalties to touch for lineouts near to the opposition's try line, won the subsequent lineout and the pack drove Back over to score.

He scored a try in the 2001 Heineken Cup Final in which Leicester beat Stade Français by 34–30, and won the lineout which led to Austin Healey's break and Leon Lloyd's winning try.

In the 2002 Heineken Cup Final he once again aroused major controversy. Tigers were leading Munster 15–9 in the final minutes of the match, and Munster had a scrum well inside the Leicester 22. With the referee distracted on the other side of the scrum, Back knocked the ball from Munster scrum-half Peter Stringer's hands before the put-in and Leicester won possession and cleared the ball. The press and Munster fans were up in arms, though Munster's players sportingly conceded that gamesmanship was an integral part of the game.

He captained England on four occasions when Martin Johnson was injured. He took over the captaincy of Leicester for the 2003/4 season, but Johnson was reinstated as captain after the coaching coup that saw Dean Richards sacked as coach and replaced by John Wells, and Back was given a role as a Player/Defence Coach.

Back was one of England's outstanding players during the 2003 Rugby World Cup, scoring two tries along the way and played his last game for England in their victory over Australia in World Cup Final 2003.  He won a total of 66 caps (4 as captain), scored 16 tries and 1 drop goal (the only English forward to do so in the history of the game) and played in 3 World Cups (1995, 1999 & 2003).

Coaching career
Back's coaching career started at Leicester Tigers following England's World Cup success in 2003, where he became their player/defensive coach. When he finally retired from playing after the Lions' tour of New Zealand in 2005, he continued as Leicester Tigers defensive coach, but to aid his coach development also took on the role of head coach of Leicester Tigers Academy and assistant forwards coach.

On 27 June 2008, Back left his beloved Tigers and signed a 3-year contract with Leeds Carnegie as head coach. In his first year Leeds Carnegie were promoted from the Championship to the Premiership, where they battled to remain against all the odds for the next 2 seasons on a very limited budget.

On 4 July 2011, after turning down a director of Rugby role at a Premiership Club announced that he would instead take on the same role at 'The Rugby Football Club (2011) Ltd', formerly known as 'Rugby Lions' in National League 3 Midlands, while Key became Chief Executive. Several high-quality players joined the new outfit, such as Ben Gollings and Leigh Hinton, which helped the Lions remain unbeaten all season (26 League + 5 Cup games), winning the League, automatic promotion and domestic cup in Back's first season.

During June 2011, Back joined Edinburgh Rugby's Coaching Team alongside ex-Ireland international scrum half, Michael Bradley and Billy McGinty.

See also
 List of top English points scorers and try scorers
 Rugby Lions

References

External links 
Neil Back's Official Endorsed website
Sporting heroes Sporting heroes player profile
Leicester Tigers player profile
Profile at scrum.com

1969 births
Living people
British & Irish Lions rugby union players from England
England international rugby union players
English rugby union coaches
English rugby union players
Leeds Tykes coaches
Leicester Tigers coaches
Leicester Tigers players
Members of the Order of the British Empire
People educated at Woodlands Academy, Coventry
Rugby union flankers
Rugby union players from Coventry